Scratch is the third album by Japanese pop singer Kaela Kimura, released on February 7, 2007. It reached number one on the Japanese Oricon albums chart.

Track listing

References

2007 albums
Kaela Kimura albums
Japanese-language albums